Rose Green  may refer to the following places in the United Kingdom (among others):
Rose Green, Assington, a hamlet in Assington, in Suffolk, England
Rose Green, Essex, hamlet in Essex, England
Rose Green, Lindsey, hamlet in Suffolk, England
Rose Green, West Sussex, area of Bognor Regis, West Sussex, England